William Ferguson may refer to:

Arts
 William Ferguson (tenor), operatic tenor, see The Tempest
 William Gouw Ferguson, Scottish painter of still life
 Will Ferguson (born 1964), Canadian writer

Sportspeople
 Bill Ferguson (American football) (born 1951), NFL linebacker
 Bill Ferguson (cricket scorer) (1880–1957)
 Willie Ferguson, Scottish footballer with Chelsea and Queen of the South
 Willie Ferguson (footballer), Scottish footballer with Celtic, Burnley and Manchester City
 William Ferguson (racing driver) (1940–2007), in Formula One competitions
 Billy Ferguson (1938–1998), Northern Irish footballer

Politicians

Australia
 William Ferguson (1891–1961), NSW, Australia politician (1953–1961)
 William John Ferguson (1859–1935), NSW, Australia politician (1894–1904)

Canada
 Will Ferguson (Ontario politician) (1954–2011), Ontario, Canada politician
 William Ferguson (Manitoba politician) (1862–1936), Canadian politician

United States
 Bill Ferguson (politician) (born 1983), Maryland state senator
 William Webb Ferguson (1857–1910), Michigan state representative

Others
 William Ferguson (1800–1828), Irish soldier of Irish military diaspora, aide-de-camp to General Simon Bolívar in Hispanoamerican wars of Independence.
 William Ferguson (Australian Aboriginal leader) (1882–1950), Indigenous Australian leader
 William Ferguson (botanist) (1820–1887), British botanist and entomologist
 William Ferguson (engineer) (1852–1935), New Zealand civil engineering manager and consultant
 William Ferguson (historian) (1924–2021), Scottish historian
 William Ferguson (Los Angeles pioneer) (1822–1910), settler
 William Ferguson (pioneer) (c. 1809–1892) early settler of South Australia
 William C. Ferguson (died 2015), American telecommunications expert, chairman and CEO of NYNEX

See also
 Sir William Fergusson, 1st Baronet (1808–1877), Scottish surgeon
 William Fergusson (physician) (1773–1846), Scottish inspector-general of military hospitals and medical writer
 William Fergusson (politician), NSW, Australia politician (1880–1887)
 William Scott Ferguson (1875–1954), Canadian–American historian, president of the American Historical Association

 Ferguson (name)